Edgard Delannoit (25 November 1929 – 1993) was a Belgian boxer. He competed in the men's featherweight event at the 1948 Summer Olympics.

References

External links
 

1929 births
1993 deaths
Belgian male boxers
Olympic boxers of Belgium
Boxers at the 1948 Summer Olympics
People from Geraardsbergen
Featherweight boxers
Sportspeople from East Flanders